Zé Luiz may refer to:

 Zé Luiz (footballer, born 1904), full name José Luiz de Oliveira, Brazilian football defender
 Zé Luiz (basketball) (born 1929), full name José Luiz Santos de Azevedo, Brazilian basketball player
 Zé Luiz (footballer, born 1943), full name José Luiz Pereira, Brazilian football defender
 Zé Luiz (footballer, born 1974), full name José Luiz Seabra Filho, Trinidadian football left-back

See also
 Zé Luís (disambiguation)